Daniel Genov may refer to:

 Daniel Genov (footballer born 1985), Bulgarian footballer who plays for PFC Svetkavitsa
 Daniel Genov (footballer born 1989), Bulgarian footballer who plays for Pirin Blagoevgrad